Alice Springs Celtic FC is an Australian soccer club based in Alice Springs, the Northern Territory. The club was one of the first football clubs to be founded in the FFNT Southern Zone Premier League. The club is part of the Football Northern Territory association.

The club has seen mild success in recent years, becoming Premiers in 2015 and Champions in 2016. The club has competed in the annual FFA Cup since 2015 where it reached the Seventh Qualifying Round, eventually losing 5–0 to Darwin Olympic.

History 

The club has been competing in the FFNT Southern Zone Premier League for many years. The club was one of the first two Northern Territory based football clubs to reach the round of 64 in the FFA Cup.

Alice Springs Celtic FC was founded in 1979 by Scottish immigrant Billy Reilly, who knew Celtic F.C. player and manager Jock Stein and wanted to name the club after the Scottish Club. The team consisted of both Alice Springs locals and also Irish and Scottish players who were living in Alice Springs. Reilly was the club's inaugural captain and alongside players such as Michael Dzamko, Charlie McGuirk, Sean Finlaw and Fabio Bonanni lead the team to many league titles over the following years. The club developed its first youth teams in 1981 with the vision of becoming the best club in Alice Springs. After winning a league titles the team would often spend the day having a BBQ at Alice Springs Telegraph Station.

The club did not have a men's A-grade team until 2010 when midfielder Steve Jones joined Celtic from rival Verdi and captained the A-grade team. Ex Palm Beach Sharks player Kris Wheeler joined Celtic from local rivals Verdi in 2011 and helped the club win the league in 2011 and 2012. Wheeler became Player-Manager in 2013 and lead the club to winning the double that same year. Celtic were unable to win back to back doubles in 2014 and lost the preliminary final 4–3 to Buckleys. After winning the 2015 minor premiership Wheeler stepped down as manager of the club and was replaced by Andrew Pye. At the conclusion of the 2016 season after moving back to wales Steve Jones was replaced as captain by Cole Nicolaou who lead Celtic to the 2017 Minor premiership in his first season as captain.

Celtic have been very successful in the local Alice Springs league, having consistently finished either first or second since 2010. The club has a long-standing rivalry with Gillen Scorpions, the rivalry has grown in recent times from the two clubs playing each other in numerous Grand Finals and FFA Cup Alice Springs playoffs. The two clubs consider each other their main rivals and the games between the two often become quite heated, and has seen the most red cards between any two clubs in Alice Springs.

Gillen Scorpions FC dissolved after the conclusion of the 2017 season, Vikings have emerged as the clubs main rival.

2015 season 

Celtic finished the 2015 season as the Premiers, finishing 7 points above rivals Gillen Scorpions having only lost 2 games. The 2015 season was the first that the club competed in the nationwide FFA Cup. After having beat Buckleys FC 4–1 in the fifth round of the 2015 FFA Cup preliminary rounds Celtic went on to beat Gillen Scorpions 5–0 on 16 June to secure their round of 64 tie against Darwin Olympic. The club took a youthful squad to Darwin, including Linwood Koonce, Nick Schmull, Dion Bandiera and striker Joe Worrall. Celtic were seen as huge underdogs in the match, Celtic winger Matt Wallace came close to scoring the opener but in the end Darwin Olympic were too good for the Alice Springs club and won the match 5–0.

Celtic lost the 2015 Grand Final 4–2 to Gillen Scorpions. Striker Dion Bandiera finished the season as the Southern Zone Golden Boot winner with 11 goals in 14 matches.

2016 season 
Celtic were unable to reach the success that they previously achieved in the FFA Cup and lost 1–0 to Gillen Scorpions in the sixth round of the 2016 FFA Cup preliminary rounds. Celtic finished the season 2 points behind Gillen Scorpions in the league table but went on the beat them 2–0 in the Grand Final, this being the first piece of silverware won under manager Andrew Pye.

16 year old striker Joseph Worrall won the Southern Zone Golden Boot with 16 goals in as many matches

2017 season 

At the beginning of the 2017 season, prolific striker Joseph Worrall transferred to MPH Vikings, after having won 3 golden boots in all age groups during his time at Celtic.

Celtic started the 2017 season with a 3–2 win against Stormbirds. In the 2017 FFA Cup, Alice Springs playoff Celtic beat Gillen Scorpions 3–2 on penalties after the match finished 0–0 after 120 minutes. Goalkeeper Zac Watts saved 2 penalties and Jacob Bonanni scored the winning penalty.

Celtic managed to continue to keep their winning run going, recording a 6–1 victory against MPH Vikings in the second round of the competition, this being the highest score recorded between the two clubs. The 2017 Season is the first season in which there will be 5 Clubs in the Men's Premier League, with the addition of Verdi FC to the league.

In the first meeting between rivals Gillen Scorpions, Celtic were beaten 3–0, this game being played 3 days before the FFA Cup Alice Springs Play-Off.

Celtic suffered an injury crisis during the buildup to the FFA Cup Round of 64 Match. With striker Jay Jay Olivares, Centre Back Nicholas Marzohl and Goalkeeper Zac Watts all being injured, as well as club legend Damon Van der Schuit re-injuring himself in a training session and prolonging his expected return from a knee injury he suffered the previous season. Back up striker John Fennelly also missed a number of weeks due to prior commitments. Because of this, manager Andrew Pye promoted reserve players Ethan Bowman and Lachlan Rothwell to the first team. Bowman is one of only 3 players to remain from the 2015 Premiership winning team and kept a clean sheet on his first appearance in the 2017 season, making a number of crucial saves throughout the match against Vikings in round 5.

Celtic lost the FFA Cup round of 16 match 2–0 against Darwin Rovers, conceding in the 16th and 18th minutes. The team went the rest of the season without dropping a point and eventually won the minor premiership with 3 games to spare, the earliest it had been won in recent times.

The club finished the season with a team in every single available final, ( U14, U16, B-Grade and A-Grade) winning the A-Grade and B-Grade ones. The B-Grade team finished 4th in the league but managed ease through the finals series recording 3–1 and 5–1 wins against Stormbirds and Vikings in the quarter and semi finals before beating the Premiers NTC U16 2–1 in the final. The A-Grade team won the grand final 2–1 over Vikings.

Out of the 4 grand finals that the club competed in 3 of those were against Vikings, this continued the rivalry between the two clubs that had been brewing in the latter stages of the season. The fixtures between the two clubs often became quite heated and saw a number of red cards throughout the age divisions. The rivalry began towards the end of the season as it seemed Celtics main rival, Scorpions, were not going to challenge for any of the titles after a poor run of form in all age divisions, so Vikings became Celtics only real challenger. The rivalry reached its climax when a Celtic tifo was burnt by Vikings fans after the A-Grade Grand Final.

2018 season 
Celtic initially struggled at the beginning of the season with many of its players not returning to the club. However, a Daniel Robson inspired squad managed to win the league by 9 points and go on to beat Stormbirds 3–0 in the grand final with Robson getting a hat trick in the semifinal against Vikings and a double in the final. Robson finished the season as league top goal scorer with 27 goals

The club also managed to finish second in the league in the newly established U19 Youth league and go onto win the grand final, with Robson getting a hat-trick in the final.

2019 season 
With a mass exodus of players, having only retained a handful from their squad of previous seasons, the team struggled throughout the year and recorded their lowest league finish since records of the FFNT Southern Zone Premier League began in 2011. Celtic finished 3rd in the league, got knocked out in the semifinal of the play-offs and didn't make it past the 4th round of the FFA Cup. Veteran John Fennelly was the club's top goal scorer with 8 goals in 15 matches

The team finished last in the reserve league and the U16's.

2020 season 
The 2020 season saw a number of highs and lows for the club. The club had quite a rocky start to the season, having to wait until round 5 to pick up their first 3 points in what turned out to be a comfortable 2–7 victory over Vikings. With the FFA Cup having been called off for the 2020 season due to the COVID-19 pandemic, it was the first time since the competition began back in 2015 that the club was only playing in one competition. Due to the lack of available players in the league, it was also the first time that there wasn't a Reserves league or U15/16 league, which the club had historically been very competitive in. The second highest age division below the MGA FICA Southern Zone Premier League was the U12 competition, where the team lost every game in the 12 round season and got knocked out in the semifinal.

After a poor start to the season, having only picked up 1 win in 5 games, the men's senior team were bottom of the table by the end of round 5 and looked on course for the clubs lowest ever finish. Despite this, momentum started to build and by the end of round 10 the team had moved up to 3rd place on the table having only dropped 3 points out of the possible 15 over the course of 5 games. Decisive victories over league leaders Verdi and second place Vikings in round 11 and 12 saw Celtic jump up to first place and then win the league in round 14 with one game to spare.

Celtic drew up against 2nd place Verdi in the MGA FICA Southern Zone Premier League Semi-Final and despite goals from Wayne Dalton and Ashlee Langford, went on to lose the match 4–2. Then despite going down to 10 men with winger Lukas Blom receiving a red card the team beat Stormbirds 2–0 in the second Semi-Final with goals from Ashlee Langford and Henok Tangey. With a number of notable players missing through suspension and injury, Celtic failed to beat Verdi in the grand final, losing the match 3–0.

Striker Ashlee Langford finished the season as the club's and league's top goal scorer with 15 goals, and added another two in the finals series.

Sponsors and kit 
Alice Springs Celtic have been using a similar kit to the Scottish Premier League club Celtic F.C. since it was founded. With green hoops on white, with white shorts and socks. For the 2017 season Celtic's main sponsors are Bonanni Brick yard, Gapview Hotel and Brian Blakeman Surveys.

Competition timeline

Honours 
 FFNT Southern Zone Premier League
Premierships: (2011, 2015, 2017, 2018, 2020)
 Champions: (2013, 2016, 2017, 2018)
 FFA Cup/Sports Minister's Cup
 Seventh Round: (2015, 2017)

References 

Soccer clubs in the Northern Territory
Sport in Alice Springs
1979 establishments in Australia
Association football clubs established in 1979
Irish-Australian culture
Scottish-Australian culture
Diaspora sports clubs in Australia
British association football clubs outside the United Kingdom